Antoine Bonfanti (23 October 1923 - 4 March 2006) was a French sound engineer and a professor at cinema schools and institutes in France and other countries. He taught regularly at INSAS in Brussels and  EICTV in Cuba, and occasionally at Fémis and ENSLL.

He was born 26 October 1923 in Ajaccio, Corsica, and died 4 March 2006 in Montpellier, France.

Career 

He began learning his profession as a trainee boom-operator on the film La Belle et la Bête by Jean Cocteau. He is considered as being one of the pioneers of direct-sound in film-making on location: “the school of direct-sound is French - said the sound-engineer Jean-Pierre Ruh- it began with Antoine Bonfanti”.

He is characterised by his collaborations with directors as Bernardo Bertolucci, André Delvaux, Amos Gitaï, Jean Luc Godard, Joris Ivens, William Klein, Chris Marker, Gérard Oury, Alain Resnais, René Vautier, and Paul Vecchiali. (see filmography below).

His primary occupation is the authenticity of sound: above all he likes building the whole universe of sound of one film, through every stage from filming to sound-mixing (that means the live-sounds, the ambiances in location and after the sound-effects, the dubbing and the mixing in auditorium). In this pattern, he had 120 films of which 80 feature films. Otherwise, his filmography includes about 420 titles of long and short Films of fiction or documentary; and within this number, some can be still missing because - as involved in cinema as in politics - Antoine did lots of "for free" that, may be, haven't been listed.
 
Member of the Résistance and, after, volunteer soldier in the war-years 1943-1945; militant, communist by spirit, vigilante, he is part of SLON collective - which later becomes ISKRA - and of the Medvedkine-groups.

He shared his sound-artist's talent and he has trained several generations of sound-engineers in many countries (Algeria, Angola, Argentina, Chile, Cuba, Morocco, Mozambique, Peru, Portugal, Tunisia, Venezuela), where to make of the cinema is a matter of fight.

The film "Antoine Bonfanti - Traces sonores d’une écoute engagée"  by Suzanne Durand,  reconstitutes a professional path of more than 50 years which demonstrate a commitment going far-beyond the simple trade and his collaboration with a lot of film-makers; it is  also an original approach of the sound's practical.

He recounts it himself also, interviewed by Noël Simsolo in a transmission on France-Culture, called "Mémoire du siècle, Antoine Bonfanti" on 20 August 1997, and broadcast during "Les Nuits de France-Culture" at midnight of 25 January 2016.

Biography 

Antoine, nicknamed "Nono" by his Corsican family, "Toni" by his war comrades, "Bonbon" within the world of cinema, was born in Ajaccio in 1923. The family leaves again for Africa in 1926, having already spent some years in Conakry in "République de Guinée", (formerly "Guinée française"). His father is "receveur principal des postes" in Bobo-Dioulasso in Burkina-Faso (formerly "Haute-Volta"). Antoine spends some of his youth there but, when his eldest brother must go to high-school,  the family returns to Corsica, before his father be appointed "percepteur" (tax-collector) at Saint-Rambert d’Alban, and after at Touquet-Paris-Plage.

As a child, he discovers the paroquial-cine in Corsica. At Touquet, the family goes to the cinema pretty often. He remembers fondly the showing of the film "Les marins de Kronstadt" d’Efim Dzigan, organised by his father to mark the death of Roger Salengro in 1936, where spectators leave the theater singing "l’Internationale". 
He is 13 during the "Front populaire". At  Boulogne-sur-Mer in the boarding-school at the "Collège Mariette" - and on his train journeys - he uses to pass near the steelworks, red flags hanging from the rooftops; and he remains very touched by the striking workers who were raising their fists to salute the train. The "pros and con" fight in the school-yard. There, Antoine "has been lucky enough to have Jean Marcenac as his teacher of  Philosophy and French, who opened up the eyes and his library".

His political awareness began in June 1940, after the "drôle de guerre". He didn't understand Paul Reynaud's phrase who said after the debacle: "I don't believe in miracles, but if someone were to tell me that a single miracle could save France, I'd believe in that miracle". But two days later the Germans were occupying Touquet.

Later, boarding at College in Orléans (his "correspondent" is a Corsican chief of police), he was expelled in November 1941 for knocking out the chief-supervisor who deprives him of his meal; Antoine was a lightweight boxer, (he was also a talented and competitive swimmer).

He feels the pull of the resistance. He produces pamphlets on linoleum "in private", and tries on several times to reach England by small boats with friends. He is becoming dangerous for his father who is part of one resistance-movement; and when Antoine is called up, in May 1942, for the construction of the "Mur de l’Atlantique", his father orders him to escape to Corsica (it's his formerly correspondent who obtains a pass for him). 
He then forms part of the “ Résistance armée urbaine” at the “Front National” (at this time: Front national pour la libération et l’indépendance de la France): “we were in a war of liberation against the Germans, and also in a war of revolution against the Petain-regime”.
In 1943, he commit himself as voluntary-soldier in the “Bataillon de choc”. He becomes “chasseur” in the fourth company. After the Toulon-loading, his batallon goes up as far as Tyrol; Antoine loses numerous comrades on the way. To his great detriment, he is only demobilized in September 1945.

He has two children from a first marriage, Jean-Claude and Francis. Years later, he married Maryvon Le Brishoual whom he met in Brazil in 1968, during the filming  of “Le grabuge” (O tumulto) by Edouard Luntz, produced by Fox. They have three children: Kalanna, Solène and Maël.

En 1946, he took correspondence lessons from the “Conservatoire des Arts et Métiers”; and thanks to his cousin, Mathieu Bonfanti, he was chosen as boomer-trainee on “ La belle et la bête” by Jean Cocteau, at the “Studios de St Maurice” where, in the following time, he learns all the roles, all the trades of sound.
In 1948, he started to work at “ Radiodiffusion française” (which become RTF en 1949 and ORTF in 1964) where he learns “ à faire ce qu’il ne faut pas faire” (what not to do).
Ardent militant, he fights against the American politics which refuses to accept quotas; but with the “Accords Blum-Byrnes”, Léon Blum sacrifices French cinema, in order “ to put France back on the right track” with the Plan Marshall accepted, and announced in June 1947.

This activism didn't stop him entering M.G.M. France (Metro Goldwyn Mayer), very famous at the time,  where he acquired control of post-synchronisation and sound-mixing. 
In 1958, he began working with most of directors “ who counted during a period which counted and who fit, more or less, the Nouvelle vague movement”. He becomes acquainted with them at the SIMO - auditorium at Boulogne-Billancourt where he admired and learned lots with Jean Neny, the great inventor of many techniques of dubbing and mixing in auditoriums.
When the film is shooting on location, he looks for other microphones, makes wind covers (bonnettes) for little booms for documentary; and later, he will spend a lot of time creating a model of square boom.

In 1962, he makes the sound, with Pierre Lhomme as cameraman, for the now mythical “Le joli mai”, film by Chris Marker. He is part of SLON, which late becomes ISKRA (whose he is manager for some years). He is part also of the Medvedkine groups: it's the extraordinary adventure with the workers from Rhodiaceta in Besançon in 1967, and those of Peugeot factories in Sochaux in 1968.

Also in 1962, he begins teaching several times a year at l’INSAS in Brussels until the mid eighties.

He took a keen interest by Cuba in 1963 during the filming of the documentary of Claude Otzenberger “Fidel si, Fidel no” (“Cuba 63”). He donated then to the ICAIC his favorite appliances (Nagra III and his fetish micro Beyerdynamic M 160). For him “Cuba is the discovery of a single application of a socialist concept, but the Cubans, remarkable people, don't deserve what they were to endure afterwards”. He is rebelling constantly against l’embargo (called blocus in Cuba) that U.S.A. established in 1962, and still applied.

En 1989, he began teaching at EICTV, each year until February 1999.

Directors such as René Vautier, Yann Le Masson, Bruno Muel, and Jacqueline Meppiel are his comrades, brothers and sister by spirit. But Antoine also is collaborator of people very different of his political family, so long as he can “make his sound to become the sound of the  film”, and  when it is all the easier for him to impose  his direct sound on films where the actors improvise and can't be dubbed in post-production (as Louis de Funès in the films of Gérard Oury).

He is invited  to talks, seminars and conferences on sound, is a jury member or president at film festivals, but he is mostly solicited to institutes, centers and cinema schools in numerous countries; the Cinemathèque of Lisbonne devoted a week to him in 1985.

In September 2000, being sick, he “goes down” to Montpellier to live with his wife Maryvon, near his beloved Mediterranean sea. That is there he dies in March 2006. Follow an uncountable number of messages of love and gratitude (both professional and private), and tributes.

Filmography 
Filmography of his different sound collaborations and at different novels according to the years; (the dates of the films - Long or Short, fiction or documentary - are those of filming or release).   
 1945-48 : Studios de Saint-Maurice
 1946 : La Belle et la Bête de Jean Cocteau
 1948-50 : la Radiodiffusion française
 1950-56 : Auditorium MGM-France
 1955 : Afrique-sur-Seine de Paulin Soumanou Vieyra
 1956 : Un général revient de René Vautier    
 1956-61 : Auditorium “la SIMO” (Direction Jean Neny), Studios de Boulogne   
 1956 : Les Aventures de Till L'Espiègle de Joris Ivens/Gérard Philippe
 1957 : Les Marines de François Reichenbach
 1958 : Hiroshima mon amour d’Alain Resnais
 1959 : Os Bandeirantes de Marcel Camus 
 1960 : Les honneurs de la guerre de Jean Devewer    
 1960 : Magritte ou la leçon de choses de Luc de Heusch  
 1961 : L’oiseau de paradis de Marcel Camus  
 1962 : La Jetée de Chris Marker
 1962 : Le Joli mai de Chris Marker
 1962 : Muriel, ou le temps d’un retour d’Alain Resnais 
 1962 : Marvejols de Mario Ruspoli   
 1962 : Octobre à Paris de Jacques Panijel
 1963 : Neuf émissions sur le cinéma polonais d’André Delvaux    
 1963 : Fidel si Fidel no (Cuba 63) de Claude Otzenberger 
 1963 : Les plus belles escroqueries du monde de Jean-Luc Godard  
 1963 : À Valparaíso de Joris Ivens
 1963 : Les Félins de René Clément
 1964 : L’insoumis d’Alain Cavalier
 1964 : Une femme mariée  de Jean-Luc Godard  
 1964 : Le Corniaud de Gérard Oury
 1964 : L’homme au crâne rasé d’André Delvaux    
 1964 : Le coup de grâce de Jean Cayrol/Claude Durand
 1964 : Bande à part de Jean-Luc Godard
 1964 : Le train de John Frankenheimer
 1965 : Le Bonheur 1re part. d'Agnès Varda
 1965 : Up to His Ears de Philippe de Broca
 1965 : Qui êtes-vous Polly Maggoo ? de William Klein
 1965 : The War Is Over d’Alain Resnais
 1965 : Pierrot le fou de Jean-Luc Godard  
 1965 : Two or Three Things I Know About Her de Jean-Luc Godard  
 1965 : Masculin Féminin de Jean-Luc Godard  
 1965 : La brûlure des mille soleils de Pierre Kast
 1965 : Nick Carter et le trèfle rouge de Jean-Paul Savignac
 1965 : Suzanne Simonin, la Religieuse de Diderot de Jacques Rivette
 1965 : Les Ruses du diable de Paul Vecchiali
 1965 : Les Cœurs verts d’Edouard Luntz
 1966 : La Loi du survivant de José Giovanni
 1966 : La Grande Vadrouille de Gérard Oury
 1966 : Jeu de massacre d’Alain Jessua
 1966 : Le Père Noël a les yeux bleus de Jean Eustache
 1966 : Le Peuple et ses fusils de Joris Ivens
 1966 : La terre et la boue de Joris Ivens
 1966 : Si j’avais 4 dromadaires de Chris Marker
 1967 : Les jeunes loups de Marcel Carné
 1967 : Un soir, un train d’André Delvaux
 1967 : Je t'aime, je t'aime d’Alain Resnais
 1967 : La Sixième face du Pentagone de Chris Marker
 1967 : A bientôt j’espère de Chris Marker/Mario Marret
 1967 : Lamiel de Jean Aurel
 1967 : Le Viol de Jacques Doniol-Volcroze
 1967 : La Chinoise de Jean-Luc Godard 
 1967 : Loin du Vietnam du Collectif : J.L.Godard, W.Klein, J.Ivens, C.Lelouch, Ch.Marker, A.Varda
 1967 : 17th Parallel: Vietnam in War de Joris Ivens, Marceline Loridan 
 1967 : Week-end de Jean-Luc Godard 
 1967 : Mexico, Mexico de François Reichenbach
 1967  : Rotterdam de Joris Ivens
 1968 : One Plus One de Jean-Luc Godard 
 1968 : Mr. Freedom de William Klein
 1968 : Le Grabuge d’Edouard Luntz
 1968 : Three de James Salter
 1968 : Nous n'irons plus au bois de Georges Dumoulin
 1968 : L'amour c'est gai, l'amour c'est triste de Jean-Daniel Pollet
 1968 : Classe de lutte du Groupe Medvedkine (Pol Cèbe)
 1968 : Sept jours ailleurs de Marin Karmitz
 1969 : La Panaf (Festival Panafricain) de William Klein
 1969 : Eldridge Cleaver de William Klein
 1969 : Tout peut arriver de Philippe Labro
 1969 : Le Dernier Saut d’Edouard Luntz
 1969 : La Maison des bories de Jacques Doniol-Volcroze
 1969 : Lettres de Stalingrad de Gilles Kast
 1969 : Le peuple et ses fusils de Joris Ivens 
 1969 : La parcelle de Jacques Loiseleux
 1969 : Wind from the East de Jean-Luc Godard  
 1970 : Popsy Pop de Jean Herman
 1970 : La fin des Pyrénées de Jean-Pierre Lajournade
 1970 : Les premiers jours de la vie de Claude Edelman
 1970 :  Nigeria, Nigeria one d’Henri Hervé 
 1970 : Le Soldat Laforêt de Guy Cavagnac
 1970 : L'Étrangleur de Paul Vecchiali
 1970 : Vladimir et Rosa de Jean-Luc Godard  
 1970 : Luttes en Italie (Lotte in Italia) de Jean-Luc Godard
 1970 : British Sounds de Jean-Luc Godard  
 1970 : Amougies (Music Power - European Music Revolution)  de Jérôme Laperrousaz  
 1970 : On vous parle du Brésil : Carlos Marighela de Chris Marker 
 1970 : On vous parle de Paris : Les mots ont un sens - François Maspero de Chris Marker
 1970 : On vous parle de Prague : Le 2e procès d’Arthur London de Chris Marker
 1970 : Le coup de l’ours de Jean-Pierre Kalfon
 1971 : Lettre à mon ami Pol Cèbe de Michel Desrois
 1971 : Paulina 1880   de Jean-Louis Bertuccelli
 1971 : Week-end à Sochaux de Bruno Muel
 1971 : La Folie des grandeurs de Gérard Oury
 1971 : Concerts de Stockhausen au Liban d’Anne-Marie Deshayes
 1971 : Belle d’André Delvaux
 1971 : L’homme de feu de Claude Caillou
 1971 : L’humeur vagabonde d’Edouard Luntz
 1971 : Lo Païs de Gérard Guérin
 1971 : Meurtre à la radio de Jacques Bral
 1971 : Avoir vingt ans dans les Aurès de René Vautier
 1971 : Le train en marche de Chris Marker
 1971 : It Only Happens to Others de Nadine Trintignant
 1971 : Démocratie syndicale de Miroslav Sebestik
 1971 : La Cicatrice intérieure de Philippe Garrel
 1972 : Athanor de Philippe Garrel
 1972 : Sans sommation de Bruno Gantillon
 1972 : Une baleine qui avait mal aux dents de Jacques Bral
 1972 : Une belle fille comme moi de François Truffaut
 1972 : La Société du spectacle de Guy Debord
 1972 : Themroc de Claude Faraldo
 1972 : Les Petits Enfants d'Attila  de Jean-Pierre Bastid
 1972 : Continental Circus de Jérôme Laperrousaz
 1973 : Gouma de Michel Papatakis
 1973 : Day for Night de François Truffaut
 1973 : Last Tango in Paris de Bernardo Bertolucci
 1973 : La Folle de Toujane de René Vautier
 1973 : Femmes au soleil de Liliane Dreyfus
 1973 : L’Inde au féminin de François Chardeaux
 1973 : L'Homme du fleuve de Jean-Pierre Prévost
 1973 : La république est morte à Dien Bien Phu de Jérôme Kanapa
 1973 : Le Mariage à la mode de Michel Mardore
 1973 : Défense de savoir de Nadine Trintignant
 1973 : Sweet Movie de Dušan Makavejev
 1973 : Le Sourire vertical de Robert Lapoujade
 1973 : Kashima Paradise de Yann Le Masson
 1973 : Pour les Palestiniens, une Israélienne témoigne d’Edna Politi
 1973 : Septembre chilien de Bruno Muel
 1974 : Tendre Dracula de Pierre Grunstein
 1974 : Le temps d’Emma (Emma Stern) de Liliane de Kermadec
 1974 : Les Versaillais ont-ils pris Paris ? Niet ! de Jacques Prayer
 1974 : La nuit du phoque de Jean-Jacques Birgé
 1974 : Les Noces de porcelaine de Roger Coggio
 1974 : La solitude du chanteur de fond de Chris Marker
 1974 : Femmes, femmes de Paul Vecchiali
 1974 : Zig-Zig de László Szabó
 1974 : L'Assassin musicien de Benoît Jacquot
 1974 : India Song de Marguerite Duras
 1974 : Tabarnac de Claude Faraldo
 1974 : Hu-Man de Jérôme Laperrousaz
 1974 : Le Voyage d'Amélie de Daniel Duval
 1974 : Il pleut toujours où c'est mouillé de Jean-Daniel Simon
 1974 : Au long de rivière Fango de Sotha
 1974 : Mort d'un guide de Jacques Ertaud
 1974 : Histoire de Paul de René Féret
 1974 : Quand tu disais Valéry de René Vautier
 1974 : La Bête de Walerian Borowczyk
 1974 : Tout bas de Noël Simsolo
 1974 : Lutte d'aujourd'hui de Miroslav Sebestik
 1974 : Si j'te cherche, j'me trouve de Roger Diamantis
 1975 : L'Homme du fleuve de Jean-Pierre Prévost
 1975 : Les Fleurs du miel de Claude Faraldo
 1975 : Je t'aime moi non plus de Serge Gainsbourg
 1975 : Je suis Pierre Rivière de Christine Lipinska
 1975 : Le Voyage de noces de Nadine Trintignant
 1975 : Ce gamin, là de Renaud Victor
 1975 : Les bicots-nègres vos voisins de Med Hondo
 1975 : Le Graphique de Boscop de Sotha et George Dumoulin
 1975 : Interview de Benjamin Murmelstein (film Le Dernier des injustes de Claude Lanzmann, sorti en 2013)
 1975 : Les Jours gris d’Iradj Azimi
 1975 : L'Affiche rouge de Frank Cassenti
 1975 : Guerre du peuple en Angola de Marcel Trillat-Bruno Muel-Antoine Bonfanti-Michel Desrois
 1975 : Pierre Molinier - 7, rue des Tourets de Noël Simsolo
 1975 : Gloria Mundi de Nikos Papatakis
 1975 : Daguerréotypes d'Agnès Varda
 1976 : Dernière sortie avant Roissy de Bernard Paul
 1976 : Le Rouge de Chine de Jacques Richard
 1976 : El Cine soy yo de Luis Armando Roche
 1976 : Les Ambassadeurs de Nacer Ktari
 1976 : Quatorze juillet(s) de Jacques Prayer
 1976 : Mademoiselle K. de Robert Faurous Palacio
 1976 : Le jardin des Hespérides de Jacques Robiolles
 1976 : Le Grand Soir de Francis Reusser
 1976 : L’adieu nu de Jean-Henri Meunier
 1976 : Le Berceau de cristal de Philippe Garrel
 1976 : Les Enfants du placard de Benoît Jacquot
 1976 : La Communion solennelle de René Féret
 1976 : La Spirale de Armand Mattelart, Valérie Mayoux et Jacqueline Meppiel
 1976 :  de Werner Schroeter
 1977 : Promesse d’été d’Olivier Delilez
 1977 : La machine de Paul Vecchiali
 1977 : Sauf dimanches et fêtes de François Ode
 1977 : Le vingt-troisième cessez-le-feu de Jean-François Dars, Anne Papillault
 1977 : En l'autre bord de Jérôme Kanapa
 1977 : Le Théâtre des matières de Jean Claude Biette
 1977 : Le Fond de l'air est rouge de Chris Marker
 1977 : Une page d’amour de Jean Rabinovitch
 1977 : La triple mort du 3e personnage d’Helvio Soto
 1977 : Faz la Coragem, Camarada de Ruy Duarte de Carvalho
 1978 : Utopia d’Iradj Azimi
 1978  : Les Aventures de Holly et Wood 1ère part.de Robert Pansard-Besson
 1978  : Exit seven d’Emile Degelin
 1978  : L’arrêt au milieu de Jean-Pierre Sentier
 1978  : Dierick Boots d’André Delvaux  
 1978  : La balle perdue de Jean-Luc Miesch
 1978  : Les petits enfants du jazz d’A.Weinberger
 1978  : Femme entre chien et loup d’André Delvaux
 1978  : Corps à cœur de Paul Vecchiali
 1978  : Grands soirs et petits matins de William Klein
 1978  : Les Belles Manières de Jean-Claude Guiguet
 1978  : Plurielles de Jean-Patrick Lebel
 1978  : Le coup du singe d’Ode Bitton et Jean-Pierre Kalfon
 1978  : L’animal en question de Vladimir Pozner
 1978  : Angela Davis de Jacqueline Meppiel
 1978  : La fête aujourd’hui de Maria Koleva
 1978  : Rue du Pied de Grue de Jean-Jacques Grand-Jouan
 1978  : Seize minutes vingt secondes de Miroslav Sebestik
 1978  : Images de femmes - Location de Noël Simsolo
 1978  : Le Rose et le Blanc de Robert Pansard-Besson
 1979 : West Indies ou les nègres marrons de la liberté de Med Hondo
 1979 : Extérieur, nuit de Jacques Bral
 1979 : Lettre de Benjamin de Simone Boruchowicz
 1979 : Simone Barbès ou la vertu de Marie-Claude Treilhou
 1979 : Série indienne : Les Bauls - Calcutta - Bénarès – Konarak de Georges Luneau 
 1979 : Des quetsches pour l’hiver de Jean-Paul Menichetti
 1979 : Hé ! Tu m'entends ?  de Renaud Victor
 1979 : Les Derviches-tourneurs de Pierre-Marie Goulet
 1979 : Tout dépend des filles de Pierre Fabre
 1979 : Tartan Jacket de Cécile Clairval
 1979 : Yamar Fiesta de Luis Figueroa
 1979 : Estraburgo en Chile de Philippe Avril (film producer)
 1979 : Grenade d’Olivier Landau
 1979 : Chants de l’aube de Noël Simsolo
 1980 : Parano de Bernard Dubois
 1980 : Haine de Dominique Goult
 1980 : Cauchemar de Noël Simsolo
 1980 : C'est la vie de Paul Vecchiali
 1980 : Le Jardinier de Jean-Pierre Sentier
 1980 : Les aventures de Holly et Wood 2e part. de Robert Pansard-Besson
 1980 : Les anciens du Vercors de Bruno Muel
 1980 : Karim de François Ode
 1980 : Instinct de femme de Claude Othnin-Girard
 1980 : Souvenir inoubliable de Philippe Nahoun
 1980 : Oxalá d’António Pedro Vasconcelos
 1980 : Comme la mer et ses vagues d’Edna Politi
 1980 : Les Brus de Juan Luis Buñuel
 1980 : Guns de Robert Kramer
 1980 : Le regard des autres de Fernando Ezequiel Solanas
 1980 : Plogoff des pierres contre des fusils de Nicole le Garrec
 1980 : Court circuits de Patrick Grandperret
 1981 : Pan-pan de Noël Simsolo
 1981 : Les Îles d’Iradj Azimi
 1981 : Corre Gitano de Tony Gatlif
 1981 : Les Filles de Grenoble de Joël Le Moign’
 1981 : Sans soleil de Chris Marker
 1981 : Lettres d'amour en Somalie de Frédéric Mitterrand 
 1982 : Ava Basta de Marie-Jeanne Tomasi
 1982 : Salut la puce de Richard Balducci
 1982 : Nous étions tous des noms d’arbres d’Armand Gatti
 1982 : L’anniversaire de Thomas de Jean-Paul Menichetti
 1982 : Ana d’António Reis et Margarida Cordeiro
 1983 : Biotherm de Jérôme Laperrousaz
 1983 : Site de Pierre-Marie Goulet
 1983 : La meute de Jean-Paul Dekiss
 1983 : Un bruit qui court de Jean-Pierre Sentier
 1983 : Demi-pression de Georges Trillat
 1983 : Taxi de nuit de Jean-Claude Bonfanti
 1983 : Mimoria de Simon Lucciani
 1983 : Point de fuite de Raoul Ruiz
 1983 : Benvenuta d’André Delvaux
 1983 : Club Med de Jérôme Laperrousaz 
 1983 : Les frères Baschet de Marc Baschet
 1983 : Un rendez-vous manqué de François Ode
 1984 : Juin de Miroslav Sebestik
 1984 : Le Juge de Philippe Lefebvre
 1984 : Notre mariage de Valeria Sarmiento
 1984 : Azzione de J.Simon Peretti
 1984 : Malavia de Dominique Tiberi
 1984 : Caméra de Marie-Jeanne Simoni
 1984 : Overdose de Georges Trillat
 1984 : Les anges d’Elsie Haas
 1984 : Comédie de François Ode
 1984 : O Lugar do Morto de António-Pedro Vasconcelos
 1984 : 2084 de Chris Marker
 1984 : Amazonie (série télé) de Jacques-Yves Cousteau
 1984 : Collages de Sarenco
 1984 : La légende inachevée de Robert Faurous Palacio
 1984 : Pouca terra de Saguenail
 1984 : Drôle d’oiseau de Michel Kania
 1985 : Rouge-gorge de Pierre Zucca
 1985 : L’éveillé du pont de l’Alma de Raoul Ruiz
 1985 : La lézarde de Gérard Lecca
 1985 : Beau temps mais orageux en fin de journée de Gérard Frot-Coutaz
 1985 : micro-endoscopie en chambre postérieure de Michel Tomasi
 1985 : Paulette, la pauvre petite milliardaire de Claude Confortès
 1985 : Transhumances : Le Retour des chevaux de Vania Villers
 1985 : Haïti d’Elsie Haas
 1985 : Ana d’Antonio Reis et Margarida Cordeiro
 1985 : Rosa la rose, fille publique de Paul Vecchiali
 1985 : Mourir un peu de Saguenail
 1986 : Avec sentiment de Paul Vecchiali
 1986 : Sauveteurs d’Emmanuel Audrain
 1986 : L’oiseau de feu d’Ann Marchi
 1986 : U Catalorzu de Dominique Maestrati
 1986 : Domaine d’Anghione de Michel Tomasi
 1987 : Plage de Pierre-Marie Goulet
 1987 : Hold-up d’Yves Pedron
 1987 : Les demoiselles d’Avignon de Noël Simsolo
 1987 : Once More ou Encore de Paul Vecchiali
 1987 : La ronde républicaine de Barbara Gaspary
 1987 : Les chemins de Zouc de Claude Massot
 1988 : Matar Saudades de Fernando Lopes
 1988 : Le Café des Jules de Paul Vecchiali
 1988 : Transfench de Jean Lefaux
 1988 : Albanie de Jean-Pierre Graziani
 1988 : Malincunia de Dominique Maestrati
 1988 : Maintenant de Pierre-Marie Goulet
 1988 : Berlin-Jérusalem (1re partie) d’Amos Gitaï
 1988 : Saint-Algue d’Yves Pedron
 1988 : Les camps du silence de Bernard Mangiante
 1988 : L'Œuvre au noir d’André Delvaux
 1988 : Une fille d’Henri Herré
 1988 : L’horloge du village de Philippe Costantini
 1988 : Jiri Kolar d’Ann Marchi
 1989 : l’amour en latin de Saguenail
 1989 : Berlin-Jérusalem (2e partie) d’Amos Gitaï
 1989 : 1001 films d’André Delvaux
 1989 : Bona sera (or La bouteille de gaz) d’Henri Graziani
 1989 : Nef de Gabriel le Bomin
 1989 : Engins d’Yves Pedron
 1989 : La déclaration des droits de l’homme de Raoul Ruiz
 1989 : L’homme en blanc d’Yves Pedron
 1989 : L’homme de terre de Boris Lehman
 1989 : La mémoire des îles d’Emmanuel Audrain
 1989 : Cristofanu Columbu de Toni Casalonga
 1989 : Les cousins d’Amérique de Philippe Costantini 
 1990 : Le cantique des pierres de Michel Khleifi
 1990 : Roman-photos de Carole Scotta
 1990 : Giorno di rabbia de Thomas Langmann
 1990 : Impetrata de Dominique Tiberi
 1990 : Le Voyage étranger de Serge Roullet
 1990 : Babel de Boris Lehman
 1990 : De l’autre côté du miroir de Dominique Maestrati
 1991 : Alba Mossa d’Yves de Peretti
 1991 : Golem, l'esprit de l'exil d’Amos Gitaï
 1991 : 1, 2, 3, soleil ! de Marie-Jeanne Simoni
 1991 : Comedie musicale de Christian Blanchet
 1991 : Madunaccia ou Nous deux d’Henri Graziani
 1991 : Babilée 91 de William Klein
 1991 : Rosa Negra de Margarida Gil
 1991 : Marie Atger d’Anita Fernandez
 1991 : Matria de Jacky Micaelli
 1991 : Entre ciel et mer de Gabriel le Bomin
 1991 : La voie royale de Dominique Maestrati
 1992 : Golem, le jardin pétrifié d’Amos Gitaï
 1992 : Chronique d’une banlieue ordinaire de Dominique Cabrera
 1992 : Noces de sable de Véronique Lindberg
 1992 : Faits et dits de Nasreddin (Hodja) de Pierre-Marie Goulet
 1993 : Tripot au feu de Jean-Jacques Privas
 1993 : Jeu fatal d’Omar Chraïbi
 1993 : Le soir de l’Angelus d’Aymeric de Valon
 1993 : Le Fond de l'air est rouge - v.ang.  de Chris Marker
 1993 : La chevelure de Bérénice d’Ann Marchi
 1993 : Portrait d’un mineur (Raconte grand-père) de Jean-Luc Debeve 
 1993 : Tap-tap d’Elsie Haas
 1993 : À la recherche du mari de ma femme  de Mohamed Abderrahman Tazi
 1994 : La parabole corse d’Ange Casta
 1994 : Asientos de François Woukoache
 1994 : Les Égarés de Gabriel Le Bomin
 1994 : De sueur et de sang  (Wonder Boy) de Paul Vecchiali
 1994 : Leçon de vie de Boris Lehman
 1995 : Marques et traces de Noël Simsolo
 1996 : Cocteau - Mensonges et vérités de Noël Simsolo
 1996-97 : Debout dans ce siècle anthracite de Christiane Rorato
 1997 : La montagne de Baya de Azzedine Meddour 
 1998 : Cubafroamérica de Maryvon Le Brishoual-Bonfanti
 1999 : Le blanc de Bilbalogo (Burkina-Faso) de Maryvon Le Brishoual-Bonfanti
 1999 : San Bartuli - l’écho de La Castagniccia de Maryvon Le Brishoual-Bonfanti
 2002 : Fragile comme le monde de Rita Azevedo

Awards 
 Césars 1977 : nomination au César du meilleur son pour le film Je t'aime moi non plus de Serge Gainsbourg.

Publication

References

External links 
 
 Bonfanti par Chris Marker
 Résistance armée urbaine
 Antoine Bonfanti - Traces sonores d’une écoute engagée
 Mémoire du siècle, Antoine Bonfanti
 Entretien avec Antoine Bonfanti par Aurelio Savini

French audio engineers
1923 births
People from Ajaccio
2006 deaths